Pain District is a district (bakhsh) in Torbat-e Jam County, Razavi Khorasan Province, Iran. At the 2006 census, its population was 16,555, in 3,483 families.  The District has no cities.  The District has two rural districts (dehestan): Gol Banu Rural District and Zam Rural District.

References 

Districts of Razavi Khorasan Province
Torbat-e Jam County